A cadet is an officer trainee or candidate. The term is frequently used to refer to those training to become an officer in the military, often a person who is a junior trainee. Its meaning may vary between countries which can include youths in voluntary youth organisations.

Usage by country

Antigua and Barbuda

The Antigua and Barbuda Cadet Corps consists of students between the ages of 12 and 19. It Is a voluntary youth organization, sponsored by the government and people of Antigua & Barbuda that acquires its membership from the Secondary School. The main objective is to provide training and personal development to the youths through paramilitary activities and  also embrace community activities. The training is geared to inspire young men and woman to become model citizens. Emphasis during training is often based on discipline, loyalty, leadership and good citizenry.

Presently, the cadet corps has 200 active members and falls under the direct command of Colonel Glyne V. Dunnah, a regular officer of the Antigua and Barbuda Defense Force (ABDF), and is a part of the ABDF. There are two categories in the Cadet Corps: Sea Cadets and Infantry Cadets. Ranks start from Recruit—WNCO.

Australia

In Australia, a cadet is an officer in training. The official rank is Officer Cadet (OCDT for members of the Australian Regular Army and OFFCDT for members of the Royal Australian Air Force), however OCDTs in the Royal Military College—Duntroon are referred to as staff cadet (Scdt) for historical reasons. A "cadet" can be a person aged between 12.5 and 19 who is a member of the Australian Defence Force Cadets (ADFC).  The ADFC is composed of the Australian Army Cadets (AAC), Australian Navy Cadets (ANC), and Australian Air Force Cadets (AAFC), which are funded by the Australian Government via the Department of Defence.

Other cadet movements include the St John Ambulance Cadets, and the South Australian Country Fire Service Cadets. The longest running cadet corps in Australia is The King's School Cadet Corps.

Austria-Hungary

In Austria-Hungary, the cadets of the Austro-Hungarian Army (1867–1918) wore the Feldwebel rank insignia on the gorget patch.

The characteristic of the cadet ranks was the so-called distinction-galloon on the sleeve ends. It was similar to the feldwebel-galloon, however, from gold colour instead of emperor-yellow. The particular rank was added as well.

Bangladesh

The recruits of the Bangladesh Army, Bangladesh Navy and Bangladesh Air Force and trainees of Bangladesh Marine Academy are called Gentleman Cadets (GC). Students of Cadet Colleges and MCSK (Military Collegiate School Khulna) as well as those volunteering in Bangladesh National Cadet Corps (BNCC) are called cadets. There are 12 Cadet Colleges in Bangladesh, nine for men and three for women, first of which the with Faujdarhat Cadet College was established in 1958. BNCC, under the dual administration of the Ministry of Defence (MoD) and the Ministry of Education (MoE), promotes youth development movement in Bangladesh.

During the Bangladesh Liberation War, cadets of this organisation played an important role as freedom fighters, with a number of casualties.

Canada

In Canada, the term "cadet" may refer to an unsworn police constable undergoing training with a police service, or a youth participant in the Canadian Cadet Organizations program. An officer-in-training with the Canadian Armed Forces is known as an "officer cadet" or a "naval cadet".

The Canadian Cadets Organization is Canada's oldest and largest youth organisation, with over 52,000 participants in 2020. The Canadian Cadets Organization is made up of three youth groups, the Royal Canadian Air Cadets, the Royal Canadian Army Cadets, and the Royal Canadian Sea Cadets, and is open to youths aged 12 to 18. The program is administered by the Department of National Defence (DND) and is sponsored by the Canadian Forces. However, cadets are not members of the Canadian Armed Forces and are not expected to join it. Funding for these organisations is provided through the DND in partnership with the Army Cadet, Air Cadet, and Navy Leagues of Canada. The Royal Canadian Mounted Police maintains a similar youth program in partnership with Scouts Canada called the RCMP Rovers and Ventures.

Officer/naval cadets in the Canadian Armed Forces are subordinate officer who are undergoing training to become a commissioned officer. Officer cadets may be post-secondary students of the Royal Military College of Canada or the Royal Military College Saint-Jean under the Regular Officer Training Plan. Civilians and non-commissioned members of the Canadian Forces that are undergoing training and commissioning programs, like the "University Training Plan for Non-Commissioned Members" or the "Commissioning from the Ranks Plan", are also appointed as officer cadets.

Finland

The National Defence University Finland educates all officers in Finnish military. All students serve as cadets under the Cadet School for the first year and then either in Navy Academy, Air Academy or one of Army Academy's schools as cadets or holding an upper cadet rank (i.e. sergeant cadet).

Germany

In Germany, the rank cadet only exists in the German Navy for officers in training. In the Army and the Luftwaffe, officers in training usually have the rank of a Fahnenjunker or ensign (German: Fähnrich) before they are promoted into the rank of a lieutenant.

Ghana

The National Cadet Corps (Ghana) (NCCG) of Ghana is an amalgamation of Army (GA), Navy (GN), Air Force (GHF), Police (GPS) and the Fire (GNFRS) Cadets in Ghana. It came into establishment in 2002 under the ministry of education, presently Ministry of Youth and Sports.

Hong Kong

Cadet corps are linked to Hong Kong colonial past include the Hong Kong Sea Cadet Corps, Hong Kong Adventure Corps, Hong Kong Air Cadet Corps and Hong Kong Army Cadets Association Limited. They are now funded by the Hong Kong government and has no ties to either the British Forces or the PLA.

India

In India, the National Cadet Corps is a voluntary cadet organization for motivating college students to pursue a career in the Indian Armed Forces. It aims to develop qualities of character, discipline, teamwork, leadership and adventure in the students. The corps organizes outdoor activities, such as camping, trekking, mountain climbing, etc. besides providing small arms training to cadets. Cadets have no commitment for serving in the armed forces, but are given a preference by the Services Selection Board when applying for officer commissions in the military services.

Cadet is also used as a rank for those enrolled in military academies of India, such as the National Defence Academy, Indian Military Academy, Indian Naval Academy, Air Force Academy, Indian Coast Guard Academy or Armed Forces Medical College (India). These cadets are commissioned as officers in the respective service upon graduation, and make a commitment to serve. The term Gentleman Cadet is used to refer to Indian Military Academy trainees.

Indonesia 

In the service academies of Indonesia which includes (Military, Naval, and Air Force) also with the Police Academy, cadets are called Taruna for military academy and police academy cadets, Kadet for naval academy cadets, and Karbol for air force academy cadets in Indonesian. For recruits or trainee who are training to be soldiers or police personnel in the enlisted ranks, the term is called Siswa which literally means "student", it also refers to students who are studying in military high schools and other training institutions.

Ireland

In Ireland, a cadet is a pupil of the military college, which carries out officer training for the Air Corps, Army and Naval Service. Training takes two years and the cadets are split into senior and junior grades and classes.

Jamaica

The cadet force came into being on November 1, 1943, and was then known as the Army and Air Cadet Force. The creation of the force was instigated by the then officer commanding (OC) troops – Brigadier T. Denis DALY, M.C; the then garrison commander – Colonel C. W. M. FIRTH, M.C; the then director of education – Hon. B. H. EASTER, C.M.G, C.B.E. and the first commandant of the cadet force in Jamaica - Colonel Michael Ralph de CORDOVA, CBE, ED, JP (then Major Michael Ralph de CORDOVA, M.B.E) who evolved the organization, rules and regulations and also designed its badge and heraldry. Prior to this date, one or two schools had training units (Army Training Corps), but by the end of November 1943, cadet units were formed in 16 different schools, colleges, and training centres, and the force was organized with an establishment of 46 officers and 1,068 cadets under the command of then Lt Col  M. R. de CORDOVA.

Netherlands 

The Royal Military Academy ( or KMA) is the service academy for the Dutch Army, the Dutch Air Force, and the Royal Marechaussee. Located in Breda, the Netherlands, the KMA has trained future officers since 1828. All students serve as cadet or holding an upper cadet rank (i.e. cadet-sergeant)

Students of the Dutch Royal Naval College ( or KIM), the service academy for the Royal Netherlands Navy, including the Netherlands Marine Corps do not serve as cadet, but as adelborst, the Dutch term for midshipman, or holding an upper adelborst rank (i.e. sergeant-adelborst).

Both cadets and adelborsts are addressed as "jonker" (derived from "jonge heer" ("young lord") ).

New Zealand 

In New Zealand, the cadet forces comprises the Sea Cadet Corps (SCC), the New Zealand Cadet Corps (NZCC), and the Air Training Corps (ATC).  All three corps are part of the umbrella organisation of the New Zealand Cadet Forces.

Norway

In Norway, a cadet is an officer in training at one of the three Norwegian War Academies ("Krigsskole"). Each service branch (Army, Navy, and Air Force) is responsible for its own war academy (i.e. Naval War Academy).

The cadets hold the rank of 2nd Lieutenant during training, and graduates as a 1st Lieutenant.

Pakistan

Pakistan has a strong line of cadet colleges throughout the country. Cadet Colleges are special school system of the Pakistan Armed Forces that act as feeder schools for the services officer training academies of the Pakistan Army, Navy and Air Force. They are specifically intended to prepare young students from a very broad range of socioeconomic and linguistic backgrounds to pass the demanding physical, educational, psychological and behavioural standards of the Inter Services Selection Board (ISSB). This is distinct from the purpose of regular cantonment schools intended to educate the children of service members. The expansion of the Pakistan armed forces, and the broadening of the social base of its officers corps from the 1960s onwards has inevitably led to the expansion in the number of cadet colleges and their distribution around the country.

Philippines

In the Philippines, the term cadet is used in mostly military attached organizations, but it is more distinctive in the service academies of the Philippines, [e.g., the Philippine Military Academy (PMA), the Philippine National Police Academy (PNPA), Philippine Merchant Marine Academy (PMMA), Maritime Academy of Asia and the Pacific (MAAP) and Aerospace Cadets of the Philippines (ACP)]. Graduates of these service academies are automatically given officer commissions in the Armed Forces of the Philippines, the Philippine National Police, Philippine Coast Guard, the Bureau of Fire Protection, and Bureau of Jail Management and Penology. Graduates of PMMA are given reserve officer status in the Philippine Navy and mostly go to private shipping firms. The term cadet is also applicable to the enrollees of Citizen's Army Training (for high school) and Reserve Officer Training Corps (for college). Service academy cadets are thought to be between the NCO and officer ranks, and NCO consider cadets as rank higher to them. Punishments for the cadets depends on their violations. If a cadet violated the rules and regulations of Philippine Military Training and the rules of the school itself, the cadet will get punished by either doing push-ups, pumping, or squat.

Officer candidates are referred to RESCOM, AFPOCS and PCGOBETC students who had baccalaureate degree, foreign service academies and reserve officer pools undergoing 4 months to 1 year of rigorous military training. On the other hand, cadets are referred to students of military schools undergoing 4 years of military training while completing their college degree.

Russia

In Russia, cadets are students who study in the Cadet Corps (Russia) which are military schools subordinate to the Ministry of Defence (Russia), they provide secondary education and also have additional military related classes which are to prepare children for future service.

Singapore

In Singapore, there are three national cadet forces, the National Cadet Corps, the National Police Cadet Corps (NPCC), and the National Civil Defence Cadet Corps (NCDCC). Secondary school students who are members of these three organisations are called 'cadets'.

In NPCC and NCDCC, the rank of Cadet is below the rank of Lance Corporal. For NPCC, Secondary One students officially attain the rank of Cadet at their Area's Swearing-In Ceremony. Cadets do not bear any rank insignia; however, the letters 'NPCC' and 'NCDCC' are at the bottom of the rank to differentiate NPCC and NCDCC Cadets from Singapore Police Force and Singapore Civil Defence Force personnel respectively.

Sri Lanka 

In Sri Lanka, there is one primary cadet force which is the National Cadet Corps (NCC). In recent years the NCC developed an Air Force Wing, a Naval Wing and a Police Wing. Western Cadet Bands and Eastern Cadet Bands
The National Cadet Corps (Sri Lanka) is the Sri Lankan military cadet corps and is a Ministry of Defence sponsored youth organisation in Sri Lanka. Formally the Ceylon Cadet Corps since 1881. It is open to high school students on voluntary basis and has a history of more than 126 years. The officers are teachers who act as instructors. The Cadets are given basic military training in small arms and parades. The officers and cadets have no liability for active military service but many volunteer to join the armed forces.

South Africa 

South Africa has a long history of having cadets, with many schools having their own corps, however after the end of apartheid they were phased out. Cadets exist today, with some schools still maintaining their own unit. The Sea Cadets are also still in existence.

Turkey 

In Turkey, a cadet is a pupil of the military college, which carries out officer training for the Air Forces, Army, Naval Forces and coast guard and gendarmerie. Training takes two years and the cadets are split into senior and junior grades and classes. Military colleges and schools were gathered under one roof within the National Defense University in 2016.

UK

In Commonwealth countries, including the United Kingdom, the rank of Cadet is the first rank of the cadet forces, higher ranks also contain the word cadet such as Cadet Warrant Officer used in the Air Training Corps however in practice they are often referred to CWO; the other ranks such as Cadet Corporal are sometimes known as Corporal. In the United Kingdom the cadet forces are the Community Cadet Forces, Combined Cadet Force and the Volunteer Cadet Corps. Other cadet organisations include Police Cadets, and St John Ambulance Cadets.

Officers in training at one of the UK's officer training schools, these are Britannia Royal Naval College for the Royal Navy, Commando Training Centre Royal Marines for the Royal Marines, Royal Military Academy Sandhurst for the British Army and Royal Air Force College Cranwell for the Royal Air Force, as well as students who are part of the Defence Technical Undergraduate Scheme, have the rank of Officer Cadet.

United States

In the United States, cadet refers to a full-time college student who is concurrently in training to become a commissioned officer of the armed forces. Students enrolled in military-themed secondary education academies or school programs (JROTC) are also referred to as cadets.

Students at the United States Military Academy, the United States Air Force Academy, and the United States Coast Guard Academy respectively hold the rank of Cadet, United States Army; Cadet, United States Air Force; and Cadet, United States Coast Guard, while students in the Army Reserve Officer Training Corps (AROTC) and the Air Force Reserve Officer Training Corps (AFROTC) respectively hold the rank of Cadet, United States Army Reserve; and Cadet, United States Air Force Reserve.  In contrast, students at the United States Naval Academy and those enrolled in the Naval Reserve Officer Training Corps (NROTC) at civilian colleges and universities are referred to as "midshipman" (plural: "midshipmen") vice cadet and hold Midshipman rank in the United States Navy and United States Naval Reserve, respectively.

Students at the United States Merchant Marine Academy and the preponderance of students at the Maine Maritime Academy, the Massachusetts Maritime Academy, the California Maritime Academy and the State University of New York Maritime College, though called cadets at their respective institutions, actually hold the rank of Midshipman, United States Merchant Marine Reserve, United States Naval Reserve.  Some state-sponsored military colleges, including The Citadel, Virginia Military Institute (VMI) and private military colleges, Wentworth Military Academy (WMA, closed in 2017, but still having an "OLD BOY" Facebook page and museum,) Norwich University (NU), refer to their students as cadets, or have lists of corps of cadets.

The word cadet also refers to youths in military youth organizations. These include the American Cadet Alliance, the California Cadet Corps, the United States Naval Sea Cadet Corps, the Young Marines and the Civil Air Patrol.

See also 
 Cadet rifle
 Police Cadet
 The Cadets Drum and Bugle Corps
 Medical Cadet Corps
 Virginia Tech Corps of Cadets
 Hong Kong Air Cadet Corps
 California Cadet Corps

References

External links 
 Volunteer Cadet Corps (Royal Naval and Royal Marines Cadets)
 Online community for cadets in UK!
 EtymologyOnLine
 United States Army Cadet Corps
 Army Cadets in Exeter & East Devon
 United States Naval Sea Cadet Corps
 UK Sea Cadet Corps
 iPoliceCadet.com
New Zealand Cadet Forces
 Canadian Cadet Movement
 Web Cadet Corps: Online International Cadet Organization circa 1996
 Australian Cadet Site
 Civil Air Patrol
 Swiss Cadets Association
 Swiss Verkehrskadetten Association
 Alpha Company Royal Marines Cadets

Military ranks
Military ranks of the United States Coast Guard
Military youth groups
Police ranks